SS Irwell was a freight vessel built for the Lancashire and Yorkshire Railway in 1906.

History

She was built in 1906 by Swan Hunter and Wigham Richardson as a sister ship to SS Mersey, and launched on 10 May 1906 for the Lancashire and Yorkshire Railway to provide freight services from Goole to Rotterdam. She made her maiden voyage from the River Tyne to Goole on 13 June 1906.

In June 1907, two stowaways were discovered when she had departed Hamburg. Clowes Enoch of Schleswig Holstein, and Joseph Todhunter of Birkenhead were found among the sails in the after part between decks

In December 1913, she was returning to Goole from Ghent when she reversed forcefully into the north wall of the dock. A small boat was smashed and some pieces of the wall were dislodged.

In 1914, she was engaged in the potato trade from Jersey, bringing the produce directly into Kingston upon Hull. She was transferred to the London and North Western Railway in 1922 and to the London, Midland and Scottish Railway in 1923.

On 15 May 1929, she left Goole for Copenhagen, but became stuck in ice off the Danish Coast north of Sjaelland with a broken rudder and the steward was reported as dead. The mate of the ship fell overboard, striking his head against one of the anchor chains, and was killed. On 18 October 1934, she collided with the British sloop Edna in the River Humber at Whitton, Lincolnshire, England. Edna sank.

She was transferred to Associated Humber Lines in 1935. She was based in Icelandic waters as a naval supply ship during World War II. In 1946, she switched to Larne to Loch Ryan service.

On 28 December 1947, she was on a voyage from Rotterdam in heavy seas; the second officer reported seeing a yacht tossing helplessly flying distress signals. The American vessel, the Seafarer had set out from Cowes to sail to Norway. During the crossing, their engine failed, and the sail was blown away by the westerly gale. They had drifted for two days before being spotted by Irwell. The crew of Irwell managed to get a line aboard Seafarer, and they towed the yacht to Masslius.

In 1948, she was transferred to the British Transport Commission and she was scrapped in March 1954 at Gateshead.

References

1906 ships
Passenger ships of the United Kingdom
Steamships of the United Kingdom
Ships built on the River Tyne
Ships of the Lancashire and Yorkshire Railway
Ships of the London and North Western Railway
Ships of the London, Midland and Scottish Railway
Maritime incidents in 1929
Maritime incidents in 1934